Hepzidine (INN) is a tricyclic antidepressant which was never marketed.

References

Bibliography
 
 

Tricyclic antidepressants
Piperidines
Dibenzocycloheptenes
Ethers
Abandoned drugs